Helidon Spa is a rural locality in the Lockyer Valley Region, Queensland, Australia.

Geography
Lockyer Creek forms much of the northern and eastern boundaries. Monkey Water Holes Creek forms most of the southern boundary before joining the Lockyer near the south-eastern corner. Rocky Creek flows through the locality from west to north, where it joins the Lockyer.

Road infrastructure
The Warrego Highway runs through from east to west.

References 

Lockyer Valley Region
Localities in Queensland